Zosmotes plumula is a species of beetle in the family Cerambycidae, and the only species in the genus Zosmotes. It was described by Pascoe in 1865.

References

Pteropliini
Beetles described in 1865